The 1984 NCAA Division III football season, part of college football in the United States organized by the National Collegiate Athletic Association at the Division III level, began in August 1984, and concluded with the NCAA Division III Football Championship, also known as the Stagg Bowl, in December 1984 at Galbreath Field in Kings Island, Mason, Ohio. The Augustana (IL) Vikings won the second of their four consecutive Division III championships by defeating the Central (Iowa) Dutch by a final score of 21−12.

Conference and program changes

Conference changes
The North Coast Athletic Conference began football play in 1984.

Program changes
Fisk University closed its football program.
After Southwestern University at Memphis changed its name to Rhodes College in 1984, the Southwestern Lynx became the Rhodes Lynx at the start of the 1984 season.
The Villanova University football program was officially reinstated with St. Lawrence University head coach Andy Talley hired to the same position, as a Division III program.  The program simply practiced and redshirted the entire team in preparation for a 1985 launch as a limited-season team.

Conference standings

Conference champions

Postseason
The 1984 NCAA Division III Football Championship playoffs were the 12th annual single-elimination tournament to determine the national champion of men's NCAA Division III college football. The championship Stagg Bowl game was held at Galbreath Field at the College Football Hall of Fame in Kings Island, Mason, Ohio for the second consecutive time. This was the final tournament to feature eight teams before expanding to sixteen in 1985.

Playoff bracket

See also
1984 NCAA Division I-A football season
1984 NCAA Division I-AA football season
1984 NCAA Division II football season

References